United International Airlines was a cargo airline with its base at Belgrade Nikola Tesla Airport in Serbia.

History
United International had previously operated under the name Air Sofia and was based in Sofia, Bulgaria. On 5 March 2007, after Bulgaria joined the EU, the airline lost its license from the Bulgarian government, along with four other airlines. The airline relocated to Serbia. However, approximately one year later, in 2008, the Serbian Civil Aviation Directorate also withdrew their license.

Fleet
 5 Antonov An-12 (YU-UIA. YU-UIB, YU-UIC, YU-UID, YU-UIE)

References

2008 disestablishments in Serbia
Airlines established in 2007
Airlines disestablished in 2008
Companies based in Belgrade
Defunct airlines of Serbia
Defunct cargo airlines
Defunct companies of Serbia
Serbian companies established in 2007